Ruth McKee may refer to:
 Ruth E. McKee, writer and United States consul at Tokyo
 Ruth Karr McKee, member of the Board of Regents, University of Washington